Asashio, meaning  "morning tide" in Japanese, may refer to:

Japanese naval ships
 , lead ship of the 1936 Asashio class
 , a class of ten destroyers of the Imperial Japanese Navy during World War II
 , lead ship of the 1965 Asashio class
 , a class of four submarines of the Japanese Maritime Self-Defense Force in 1965

People
 Asashio Tarō (disambiguation), several Japanese sumo wrestlers
 Minanogawa Tōzō (1903–1971), Japanese sumo wrestler